Mount Liantai is a mountain region located near Xia Village in the Changqing District of the City of Jinan, Shandong, China. The area is renowned for numerous caves of varying size and shape. The main cave (Touming cave) on Mount Liantai connects two opposite mountain slopes.

References

Mountains of Shandong
Tourist attractions in Shandong